Tetronarce macneilli, commonly known as the shorttail torpedo, is a species of large electric ray. The taxonomy of the species has been long debated and has been suggested that it is synonymous with Torpedo fairchildi.

Distribution and Habitat
This species is found off of southern Australia from Port Hedland to the Swain Reefs in tropical-cool temperate waters. It is noted for having an unusually large range for a ray species. It feeds on fishes and crustaceans.

Description
It is capable of delivering an intense electric shock if handled in defense and also uses this ability to hunt prey.

References

Tetronarce
Fish described in 1932
Strongly electric fish